Ionuț Alin Pop (born 1 August 1997) is a Romanian footballer who plays as a goalkeeper for Liga II side CSM Slatina, on loan from Hermannstadt.

Club career
Pop started his career in local club Bihor Oradea, before he signed to Italian first tier A.S. Roma. He never played a match in the first team, he was loaned to third tier Fidelis Andria to the 2016–17 season. He made his professional debut on 14 September 2016 against Paganese, playing 90 minutes. On 7 July 2017, fellow third tier side Alessandria signed him for an undisclosed fee.

On 26 June 2019, Ionuț Pop signed a contract with Liga I side FC Hermannstadt.

International career 
Pop made his debut in the Romania national under-19 football team on 17 November 2015 against Switzerland. He received a red card in the 82nd minute.

Career statistics

Club

Honours

US Alessandria Calcio 1912
Coppa Italia Serie C: 2017–18

References

Sources
 
 

1997 births
Living people
Sportspeople from Oradea
Romanian footballers
Romania youth international footballers
Association football goalkeepers
FC Bihor Oradea players
Serie A players
A.S. Roma players
Serie C players
S.S. Fidelis Andria 1928 players
U.S. Alessandria Calcio 1912 players
Liga I players
Liga II players
FC Hermannstadt players
CSM Slatina footballers
Romanian expatriate footballers
Romanian expatriate sportspeople in Italy
Expatriate footballers in Italy